Somewhere Between is an American drama television series commissioned by ABC and produced by ITV Studios America and Thunderbird Entertainment. The show is an American adaptation of the Korean mystery TV show God's Gift: 14 Days, which aired on SBS. The show follows a mother who tries to change the fate of her daughter's murder. It stars Paula Patton, while Stephen Tolkin serves as writer and executive producer. Production began on March 7, 2017, in Vancouver, British Columbia. The series premiered as a summer replacement on July 24, 2017, and was cancelled after one season of 10 episodes.

Cast
 Paula Patton as Laura Price – A local superstar news producer in San Francisco, helping the police to hunt down a serial killer. A fiercely loving mother, Laura's world comes to a crashing end when her daughter, Serena, is abducted and murdered by the killer. Attempting suicide, Laura inexplicably wakes up a week before Serena's death. From this point, Laura teams up with ex-cop Nico Jackson, who shared a similar "reset" moment, to track down the killer to change her daughter's fate.
 Devon Sawa as Nico Jackson – A former cop-turned-private investigator, Nico was a decorated SFPD detective whose fiancé, Susanna Spencer, was murdered; his brother, Danny, was convicted and sentenced to death for the crime, and Nico, believing he was guilty, testified against him. Struggling emotionally due to his loss, he was later fired from the police department for the brutal beating of a civilian. Turning to unscrupulous private eye work, Nico was almost killed and had a similar "reset" moment like Laura, waking up a week before Serena's death. Nico teams up with Laura to track down the killer.
 JR Bourne as Thomas "Tom" Price – Laura's powerful yet sensitive husband who is also the city's district attorney, Tom previously prosecuted the case against Danny and had him sentenced to death, although it is later implied he is hiding secrets regarding Danny's case. After Laura's "reset," he becomes increasingly concerned by her erratic behaviour.
 Aria Birch as Serena Price – Laura's and Tom's daughter, who is abducted and drowned by a serial killer targeted by her mother. Unable to cope, Laura attempted suicide three months after Serena's death in the same lake her body was found in, but instead wakes up a week before Serena's death, with an opportunity to change her fate.
 Catherine Barroll as Grace Jackson – Nico's and Danny's mother and Ruby's grandmother and caretaker, Grace is the only person who believes Danny is innocent, and she is desperately trying to prove his innocence before he is executed.
 Camille Mitchell as Esperanza, Laura's mother and Serena's grandmother, an expensively preserved beauty who lives in a high end psychiatric facility where Laura, Nico and Serena go to visit her. There's bad blood between Laura and her damaged mother, but Esperanza adores her grandchild Serena, and does her best to help them all out.
 Samantha Ferris as Capt. Kendra Sarneau – An SFPD captain and Nico's former boss, in charge of the police effort to track down the killer.
 Noel Johansen as Danny Jackson – Nico's brother, Grace's younger son and Ruby's father. Danny has an intellectual disability which his daughter inherited. Danny was convicted of killing three women, including his brother's fiancé Susanna, whose body Danny was found holding by his brother. Armed with a great deal of evidence, Danny's confession, and Nico's testimony against him in court, Tom successfully had Danny convicted and sentenced to death. Three months after Serena's death, Danny is executed by lethal injection; however, Nico's "reset" gives him the opportunity to change his fate.
 Imogen Tear as Ruby Jackson – Danny's daughter, Nico's niece and Grace's granddaughter. Ruby inherited the same intellectual disability as her father, but is happy and free-spirited. She becomes fast friends with Serena, much to Laura's anguish.
 Carmel Amit as Jenny – A private investigator and ex-con who is Nico's partner.
 Daniel Bacon as Inspector Glenn 'Cupcake' Kupner – An SFPD inspector and old friend of Nico's.
 Michael St. John Smith as Gov. Preston DeKizer – The Governor of California. A strong supporter of the death penalty against convicted murderers, he is campaigning to have executions resumed, beginning with Danny's.
 Rebecca Staab as Colleen DeKizer – The Governor's wife.
 Serge Houde as Richard Ruskin – The Governor's experienced Chief of Staff, and an old political hand.

Premise
Somewhere Between revolves around Laura Price and her daughter. After a series of murders in the vicinity, Laura realizes that she is reliving the day in a Groundhog Day–style reset. However, she has only one chance to understand what is happening and stop the killer from hurting her.

Development
On February 16, 2016, ABC announced a 10-episode straight-to-series order for an American remake of the Korean TV series God's Gift: 14 Days, which aired on SBS. The show was scheduled to start shooting in Vancouver, Canada in March 2017, for an air date in July 2017, and was written by Stephen Tolkin. Production of the show began on March 7, 2017.

On January 26, 2017, it was announced that Paula Patton had been cast as the lead. On February 21, 2017, Devon Sawa was cast as the male lead. JR Bourne joined the cast two days later.

Episodes

References

External links
 
 

American Broadcasting Company original programming
2010s American drama television series
2017 American television series debuts
2017 American television series endings
American thriller television series
American television series based on South Korean television series
English-language television shows
Television series by ITV Studios
American time travel television series
Television shows set in San Francisco
Television shows filmed in Vancouver
Television series about journalism
2010s American time travel television series